Dilshod Aripov (born May 20, 1977 in Tashkent) is an amateur Uzbekistani Greco-Roman wrestler, who played for the men's lightweight category. He is a two-time medalist at the Asian Games, and five-time at the Asian Wrestling Championships. Aripov also achieved his early international success by defeating Armenia's Karen Mnatsakanyan for a gold medal in the 58 kg class at the 2001 World Wrestling Championships in Patras, Greece.

Aripov made his official debut for the 2000 Summer Olympics in Sydney, where he competed in the men's featherweight division (58 kg). He placed second in the preliminary pool round against Kazakhstan's Yuriy Melnichenko and two-time Asian wrestling champion Kim In-Sub of South Korea, with a total score of two technical points, finishing only in eleventh overall position.

Eight years later, Aripov qualified for the men's 60 kg class at the 2008 Summer Olympics in Beijing after placing second from the Asian Wrestling Championships in Jeju City, South Korea. He first defeated Serbia's Davor Štefanek in the qualifying round, before losing out his next match to Kyrgyzstan's Ruslan Tumenbaev, who eventually won the bronze medal in this event.

At the 2009 World Wrestling Championships in Herning, Denmark, Aripov recaptured his success from an eight-year drought by claiming a silver medal in the final match against defending Olympic champion Islambek Albiev of Russia, with a technical score of 0–4.

References

External links
Profile – International Wrestling Database
NBC Olympics Profile

1977 births
Living people
Olympic wrestlers of Uzbekistan
Wrestlers at the 2000 Summer Olympics
Uzbekistani male sport wrestlers
Wrestlers at the 2008 Summer Olympics
Asian Games medalists in wrestling
Sportspeople from Tashkent
Wrestlers at the 1998 Asian Games
Wrestlers at the 2002 Asian Games
Wrestlers at the 2006 Asian Games
World Wrestling Championships medalists
Asian Games silver medalists for Uzbekistan
Asian Games bronze medalists for Uzbekistan
Medalists at the 2002 Asian Games
Medalists at the 2006 Asian Games